is a decision of the Supreme Court of Canada concerning the law of marine insurance, which also has international impact.

Background

In 1999, QuébecTel (subsequently acquired by Telus), in conjunction with Hydro-Québec, laid two fibre optic cables across the Saint Lawrence River:

 Sunoque I, from Point-au-Père to Baie-Comeau, and
 Sunoque II, from Le Bic to Forrestville.

In June 2006, Réal Vallée, a local fisherman engaged in snow crab and whelk fishing aboard the catamaran Realice, had strung a series of cages on the river bottom, secured at both ends by small anchors attached to buoys. One of these anchors got snagged onto the cable. The anchor with the cable attached was hauled out of the water, and Vallée freed it by cutting the cable with an electric saw. Several days later, the same thing happened and he cut the cable again. He had done so, believing that the cable had been abandoned (according to a handwritten note on a map he had seen at a local museum).

Telus, Hydro-Québec, and Bell Canada (which had a right of use of the cable), shared the cost of repair in accordance with a pre-existing contract among them. When Vallée learned of the repairs that were being undertaken, he consulted a lawyer, notified his underwriters (who promptly denied coverage), and made a voluntary statement to the police. He was later charged with committing mischief by wilfully damaging property exceeding $5,000 in value, and was subsequently acquitted.

Telus and Hydro-Québec commenced an action in the Federal Court of Canada:

 in personam against Peracomo Inc. (the owner of the Realice) and Vallée, and
 in rem against the ship.

The defendants also instituted third party proceedings against their underwriters, Royal and Sun Alliance Insurance Company of Canada in order to regain their insurance cover.

The courts below
At the Federal Court:

 The defendants were found to have joint and several liability for the damage, with the plaintiffs being awarded damages and interest amounting to about $1.21 million.
 The defendants’ third party action was dismissed.
 Costs were awarded in favour of the plaintiffs and the third party against the defendants.

Harrington J, in his ruling, found that:

 the appellants were liable in negligence for damaging the cable because Vallée had breached his common law duty of care and statutory duty to be aware of the submarine cables in the areas in which he fished.
 Peracomo Inc. was liable for Mr. Vallée’s actions, not only vicariously, but also personally.
 Vallée did not own or consult any of the maritime charts of Zone 17, as required under Canadian law.
 while the Marine Liability Act provided for liability to be capped at $500,000 for property damage caused by ships similar in size to the Realice, art. 4 of the Convention on Limitation of Liability for Maritime Claims provides that the cap does not apply where a loss resulted from a person’s intentional or reckless conduct.
 coverage of the loss through the appellants' insurance policy was excluded by the Marine Insurance Act, because cutting the cable fell within the statutory exclusion from marine liability insurance for "wilful misconduct".

The Federal Court of Appeal affirmed the ruling. In his ruling, Létourneau JA also held that, under existing precedent, employees, officers and directors will be held personally liable for tortious conduct causing property damage even when their actions are pursuant to their duties to the corporation. In addition, the Convention contemplates such scenarios.

Vallée appealed to the Supreme Court of Canada, and leave to appeal was granted in January 2013.

At the Supreme Court
In a 4-1 ruling, the appeal was allowed in part. In relation to the appellants’ limitation of liability, the appeal was allowed with costs but including only one-half of their costs of the leave application. The appellants’ joint and several liability is limited by the Convention. In relation to the claim against the insurer, the appeal was dismissed with costs including its costs of the leave application. In his ruling, Cromwell J held that:

Corporate personality is not a relevant consideration in this case, since Vallée was personally negligent in cutting the cable. Therefore, the company was liable as a result of his acts, not the other way around. The courts below were correct in holding Vallée personally liable.
The Federal Court of Appeal gave a narrow interpretation to the intent requirement under art. 4 of the Convention, effectively stating that all that was required to break the limit on liability is knowledge that one is interfering with property. Such an approach undermines the Convention’s purpose to establish a virtually unbreakable limit on liability and does not accord with its text.
While the threshold to break liability under the Convention requires intention or recklessness with knowledge that the loss will probably occur, wilful misconduct under the Marine Insurance Act does not require either intention to cause the loss or subjective knowledge that the loss will probably occur. In that regard, "wilful misconduct" has a different meaning under Canadian maritime law than it does under the Civil Code of Quebec. Accordingly, the appellants’ loss is excluded from insurance coverage.

Dissent
While agreeing with Cromwell J that the Convention applied so as to limit liability, Wagner J believed that the relevant provision of the Marine Insurance Act must be read harmoniously with the Convention'''s provisions, and would have therefore allowed the appeal in its entirety, with costs. Both the provisions at issue require proof of the same fact: that the insured had knowledge of the harmful consequences of his or her act, and intended or was reckless with regard to those consequences. The fact that a reasonable person ought to have known or that a person had a duty to know, does not suffice to characterize the misconduct as willful. It is also necessary to establish that the person intended to cause a loss, or to prove gross negligence or misconduct in which there is a very marked departure from the conduct of a reasonable person.

Impact
As Peracomo was concerned with the interpretation of the Convention, and could therefore have a wide-reaching impact on commercial maritime law around the world, the case attracted international attention. It is of interest to insurers in the areas of marine insurance and protection and indemnity insurance.

The Court looked to previous cases concerning the Convention, as well as examining the Warsaw Convention (which had inspired art. 4). It effectively pointed out that art. 4 focuses on an intention to cause the loss, while the right to limit under the Convention relates more generally to the claim. It also affirmed that the limitation of liability regime under the Convention'' is "virtually unbreakable", which was already the view of many legal observers.

As Wagner J pointed out, formalizing a legal difference between "reckless conduct" and "wilful misconduct" is likely to have commercial implications, and possibly increase litigation between marine insurers and their insureds.

Further reading

Hearing at the Supreme Court

Discussion of the lower courts' rulings

Notes

References

Supreme Court of Canada cases
2014 in Canadian case law
Admiralty case law
Insurance law